The Amateur is a 1981 Canadian crime/thriller film directed by Charles Jarrott with a screenplay by Robert Littell, which he then adapted into a novel of the same name. It stars John Savage and Christopher Plummer.

Plot
When his fiancée is murdered by terrorists, a Central Intelligence Agency (CIA) cryptographer named Charles Heller blackmails his superiors into sending him on a field assignment into Czechoslovakia to assassinate those responsible. Just as he enters the field, the CIA locates the stolen material he had been using to blackmail the agency, eliminating their need to cooperate with him. So he is behind the Iron Curtain, inadequately trained, and without support.

He nonetheless reaches his safe house, meets his local contact, Elisabeth, and kills two members of the terrorist band. He discovers the location of their ringleader, Schräger, the man who had killed his fiancé, but attracts the attention of the local security forces, who begin following him.

At the site where he expects his final showdown with Schräger he is ambushed by his CIA trainer, Anderson, who explains that Schräger is a double agent working for the CIA who had killed his fiancé under orders to establish his  by murdering an American.  He insists that Heller explain his own rogue status to Schräger so that the terrorist, who believes Heller was sent by the CIA to kill him, will continue to work with the Americans.

A senior agent of the local security service, Lakos, overhears all this.

Schräger arrives, kills Anderson in a shootout, and is killed by Heller. Lakos, who has come to respect Heller, helps him and Elisabeth escape back to the west in exchange for his promise to write a book embarrassing the CIA.

Cast
 John Savage as Charles Heller
 Christopher Plummer as Professor Lakos
 Marthe Keller as Elisabeth
 Arthur Hill as Brewer
 Jan Rubeš as Kaplan
 John Marley as Molton
 Ed Lauter as Anderson

Filming locations
 Kleinburg, Ontario
 Toronto, Ontario
 Oakville, Ontario
 Valley Halla Estate, Scarborough, Toronto, Ontario
 Vienna, Austria

Recognition
1982 nominations from the Genie Awards:
 Best Achievement in Art Direction/Production Design - Trevor Williams
 Best Achievement in Overall Sound - Dennis Drummond, Wayne Griffin, Michael O'Farrell
 Best Achievement in Sound Editing - Austin Grimaldi, Joe Grimaldi, Peter Shewchuk, Dino Pigat
 Best Motion Picture - Garth Drabinsky, Joel B. Michaels
 Best Performance by a Foreign Actor - John Savage
 Best Performance by a Foreign Actress - Marthe Keller
 Best Performance by an Actor in a Leading Role - Christopher Plummer
 Best Performance by an Actor in a Supporting Role - Nicholas Campbell
 Best Performance by an Actress in a Supporting Role - Chapelle Jaffe
 Best Screenplay Adapted from Another Medium - Diana Maddox

References

External links 
 
 
  (Link currently only available to IMDbPro subscribers)
 Robert Littell interview
 

1981 films
Cold War spy films
Films about terrorism
English-language Canadian films
1980s English-language films
Films set in the United States
Films shot in Toronto
1980s crime thriller films
Canadian political thriller films
Films directed by Charles Jarrott
1980s Canadian films